Miloš Bajalica (born 15 December 1981) is a Serbian football defender currently playing for Radnički Kovači.

Career
He proved his quality while playing for OFK Beograd. He was named captain at OFK by new manager Ratko Dostanić. Bajalica caught the attention from many clubs and eventually signed with neighbours Red Star Belgrade. In 2008, he moved to Japan to play for Nagoya Grampus. He was released by Nagoya Grampus at the end of Season 2009. On 17 February 2010, it was announced on the official website of Henan Construction that Bajalica signed for them to join his Serbian compatriot Goran Gavrančić. He then moved to Shaanxi Chanba, but left after not having successful second season to Kyoto Sanga FC. In summer 2016 Bajalica joined Morava Zone League side Radnički Kovači.

References

External links

 Kyoto Sanga FC Profile  

1981 births
Living people
Footballers from Belgrade
Serbian footballers
Serbian expatriate footballers
OFK Beograd players
Red Star Belgrade footballers
Serbian SuperLiga players
Nagoya Grampus players
Kyoto Sanga FC players
J1 League players
J2 League players
Expatriate footballers in Japan
Serbian expatriate sportspeople in Japan
Association football defenders
Expatriate footballers in China
Henan Songshan Longmen F.C. players
Beijing Renhe F.C. players
Serbian expatriate sportspeople in China
Chinese Super League players
OFK Radnički Kovači players